Sir Edmund de la Pole (died 1419) was an English knight and Captain of Calais.

He was the second son of Sir William de la Pole of Hull and younger brother of Michael de la Pole, 1st Earl of Suffolk.

He was Captain of Calais castle and controller of the town from 1384 to 1388.

He served as High Sheriff of Cambridgeshire and Huntingdonshire for 1389 and a JP from 1390. He was knight of the shire (MP) for Buckinghamshire in 1376 and 1383 and Cambridgeshire in 1395.

By his first wife Elizabeth de Haudlo, daughter of Richard de Haudlo and sister of Edmund de Haudlo of Boarstall, Buckinghamshire, and of Hadlow, Kent, he had Elizabeth de la Pole (14 July 1362 – 14 December 1403), who married Sir Ingram Bruyn of South Ockendon, Essex (Titchfield, Hampshire, 6 December 1353 – 12 August 1400, buried South Ockendon, Essex), grandson of Maurice le Brun, 1st Baron Brun. His second wife was Maud, daughter of John Lovett, with whom he had a son, Walter, who became Constable of Ireland.

He died on 3 August 1419 at his seat at Boarstall, Buckinghamshire.

References
 History of Parliament POLE, Edmund de la (C.1387-1419) of Boarstall Castle, Bucks and Dernford in Sawston, Cambs
G.E. Cokayne; with Vicary Gibbs, H.A. Doubleday, Geoffrey H. White, Duncan Warrand and Lord Howard de Walden, editors, The Complete Peerage of England, Scotland, Ireland, Great Britain and the United Kingdom, Extant, Extinct or Dormant, new ed., 13 volumes in 14 (1910–1959; reprint in 6 volumes, Gloucester, U.K.: Alan Sutton Publishing, 2000), volume II, pp. 355–356.
 Willement’s roll of arms

Year of birth unknown
1419 deaths
English knights
High Sheriffs of Cambridgeshire and Huntingdonshire
History of Calais
Year of birth uncertain
English MPs 1376
English MPs February 1383
English MPs 1395